MODFLOW is the U.S. Geological Survey modular finite-difference flow model, which is a computer code that solves the groundwater flow equation. The program is used by hydrogeologists to simulate the flow of groundwater through aquifers. The source code is free public domain software, written primarily in Fortran, and can compile and run on Microsoft Windows or Unix-like operating systems.

Since its original development in the early 1980s, the USGS has made six major releases, and is now considered to be the de facto standard code for aquifer simulation. There are several actively developed commercial and non-commercial graphical user interfaces for MODFLOW.

MODFLOW was constructed in what was in 1980's called a modular design. This means it has many of the attributes of what came to be called object-oriented programming. For example, capabilities (called "packages") that simulate subsidence or lakes or streams, can easily be turned on and off and the execution time and storage requirements of those packages go away entirely. If a programmer wants to change something in MODFLOW, the clean organization makes it easy. Indeed, this kind of innovation is exactly what was anticipated when MODFLOW was designed.

Importantly, the modularity of MODFLOW makes it possible for different Packages to be written that are intended to address the same simulation goal in different ways. This allows differences of opinion about how system processes function to be tested. Such testing is an important part of multi-modeling, or alternative hypothesis testing. Models like MODFLOW make this kind of testing more definitive and controlled. This results because other aspects of the program remain the same. Tests become more definitive because they become less prone to being influenced unknowingly by other numerical and programming differences.

Groundwater flow equation 
The governing partial differential equation for a confined aquifer used in MODFLOW is:

where
 is the potentiometric head (L)
 is a volumetric flux per unit volume representing sources and/or sinks of water, where negative values are extractions, and positive values are injections (T−1)
 is the specific storage of the porous material (L−1); and
 is time (T)

Finite difference
The finite difference form of the partial differential in a discretized aquifer domain (represented using rows, columns and layers) is:

where
 is the hydraulic head at cell i,j,k at time step m
CV, CR and CC are the hydraulic conductances, or branch conductances between node i,j,k and a neighboring node
 is the sum of coefficients of head from source and sink terms
 is the specific storage
 are the dimensions of cell i,j,k, which, when multiplied, represent the volume of the cell; and
 is the time at time step m

This equation is formulated into a system of equations to be solved as:

where

or in matrix form as:

where
A is a matrix of the coefficients of head for all active nodes in the grid
 is a vector of head values at the end of time step m for all nodes in the grid; and
 is a vector of the constant terms, RHS, for all nodes of the grid.

Limitations

 The water must have a constant density, dynamic viscosity (and consequently temperature) throughout the modelling domain (SEAWAT is a modified version of MODFLOW which is designed for density-dependent groundwater flow and transport)

 The principal components of anisotropy of the hydraulic conductivity used in MODFLOW is displayed on the right. This tensor does not allow non-orthogonal anisotropies, as could be expected from flow in fractures. Horizontal anisotropy for an entire layer can be represented by the coefficient "TRPY" (Data Item 3 Page 153).

Versions

"Modular Model" 
The USGS throughout the 1970s had developed several hundred models, written in different dialects of FORTRAN. At the time, it was common practice to rewrite a new model to fit the need of a new groundwater scenario. The concept for MODFLOW was originally designed in 1981 to provide a common modular groundwater model, which could be compiled on multiple platforms without major (or any) modification, and can read and write common formats. Different aspects of the groundwater system would be handled using the modules, similar to the idea of a "component stereo system". The original name of the code was "The USGS Modular Three-Dimensional Finite-Difference Ground-Water Flow Model", or informally as "The Modular Model."  The name MODFLOW was coined several years after the initial code development, which started in 1981.

The first version of MODFLOW was published on December 28, 1983, and was coded entirely in FORTRAN 66. The source code for this version is listed in USGS Open File Report 83-875 referred to above.

MODFLOW-88 
This version of MODFLOW was rewritten in FORTRAN 77, and was originally released on July 24, 1987. The current version of MODFLOW-88 is 2.6, released on September 20, 1996.

MODPATH, was initially developed in 1989 to post-process the steady-state MODFLOW-88 data to determine three-dimensional pathlines of particles. This innovation has been indispensable for the fields of contaminant hydrogeology. It is still used as a post-processor in recent versions of MODFLOW.

A separate program, MODFLOWP, was developed in 1992 to estimate various parameters used in MODFLOW. This program was eventually built into MODFLOW-2000.

MODFLOW-96 
MODFLOW-96 (version 3.0) was originally released on December 3, 1996, and is a cleaned-up and revised continuation of MODFLOW-88. There are three final releases of MODFLOW-96:
 MODFLOW-96 (version 3.3, May 2, 2000)
 MODFLOW-96h (version 3.3h, July 10, 2000), with HYDMOD package
 MODFLOWP (version 3.2, Oct 9, 1997), MODFLOW-96 with parameter-estimation

Several graphical interfaces were first developed using the MODFLOW-96 code.

MODFLOW-2000 
MODFLOW-2000 (version 1.0; version numbering was reset) was released on July 20, 2000, which merged MODFLOWP and HYDMOD codes into the main program and has integrated observation, sensitivity analysis, parameter estimation, and uncertainty evaluation capabilities. Many new packages and enhancements were also included, including new solvers, stream and saturated flow packages. The internal design concepts also changed from previous versions, such that packages, processes and modules are distinct. This version was coded in a mixture of FORTRAN 77, Fortran 90, and one solver was programmed in C. MODFLOW-2000 can also be compiled for parallel computing, which can allow multiple processors to be used to increase model complexity and/or reduce simulation time. The parallelization capability is designed to support the sensitivity analysis, parameter estimation, and uncertainty analysis capabilities of MODFLOW-2000.

The final version of MODFLOW-2000 (or MF2K) is version 1.19.01, released on March 25, 2010. There are four related or branched codes based on MODFLOW-2000:
 MF2K-GWM or GWM-2000 (version 1.1.4, May 31, 2011, branched from mf2k 1.17.2), with groundwater management capability using optimization
 MF2K-FMP (version 1.00, May 19, 2006, based on mf2k 1.15.03), with Farm Process
 MF2K-GWT (version 1.9.8, October 28, 2008, based on MF2K 1.17.02), groundwater flow and solute-transport model
 SEAWAT (version 4.00.05, October 19, 2012), variable-density flow and transport processes
 VSF (version 1.01, July 5, 2006), variably saturated flow

MODFLOW-2005 
MODFLOW-2005  differs from MODFLOW-2000 in that the sensitivity analysis, parameter estimation, and uncertainty evaluation capabilities are removed. Thus, the support for these capabilities now falls to "clip on" codes that are supported externally to the MODFLOW support effort. In addition, the code was reorganized to support multiple models within one MODFLOW run, as needed for the LGR (Local Grid Refinement) capability. MODFLOW-2005 is written primarily in Fortran 90 and C, with C being used for one solver.

The current version of MODFLOW-2005 is version 1.12.00, released on February 3, 2017. Related or branched codes include:
 MODFLOW-CFP (version 1.8.00, February 23, 2011), conduit flow process to simulate turbulent or laminar groundwater flow conditions
 MODFLOW-LGR (version 2.0, September 19, 2013), local grid refinement
 GWM-2005 (version 1.4.2, March 25, 2013), groundwater management capability using optimization
 MF2005-FMP2 (version 1.0.00, October 28, 2009), estimate dynamically integrated supply-and-demand components of irrigated agriculture as part of the simulation of surface-water and ground-water flow
 MODFLOW-NWT(version 1.1.3, August 1, 2017), Newton formulation for solving problems involving drying and rewetting nonlinearities of the unconfined groundwater-flow equation.
 MODFLOW-OWHM (version 1.00.12, October 1, 2016), The One-Water Hydrologic Flow Model (MODFLOW-OWHM, MF-OWHM or One-Water), developed cooperatively between the USGS and the U.S. Bureau of Reclamation, is a fusion of multiple versions of MODFLOW-2005 (NWT, LGR, FMP, SWR, SWI) into ONE version, contains upgrades and new features and allows the simulation of head-dependent flows, flow-dependent flows, and deformation dependent flows that collectively affect conjunctive use of water resources.
 MODFLOW-USG.  All version of MODFLOW listed above are constructed on what is called a structured grid. That is, the grid is composed of rectilinear blocks. The only exception is the LGR capability, which allows locally refined grids to be inserted into the structure of a "parent" grid. The local area is again composed of rectilinear blocks, but the blocks are smaller. Experimentation with a much more flexible grid structure resulted in the release of MODFLOW-USG (version 1.3.00, December 1, 2015), designed to be adapted to a wide range of grid variations using unstructured grids. MODFLOW-USG has similar capabilities as MODFLOW 6, which provides grid capabilities with and intermediate level of flexibility.

MODFLOW 6 
MODFLOW 6 (MF6), first released in 2017, is the sixth core version of MODFLOW to be released by the USGS. This release is a rewrite of MODFLOW following an object-oriented programming paradigm in Fortran, and provides a platform that includes the capabilities from several previous MODFLOW-2005 versions, including MODFLOW-NWT, MODFLOW-USG, and MODFLOW-LGR. MODFLOW 6 supports structured or unstructured grids, has full support for the Newton-Raphson formulation, and has a unique Water Mover Package that allows flows to be routed between the advanced packages, including the Streamflow Routing, Lake, Multi-Aquifer Well, and Unsaturated Zone Flow Packages.  MODFLOW 6 also contains a Groundwater Transport (GWT) model that simulates transient three-dimensional solute transport on structured or unstructured grids and through the advanced flow and mover packages.  An Application Programming Interface (API) is also available for MODFLOW 6, which allows the program to be coupled with other models or controlled with popular scripting languages, such as Python.  While there are a few features lacking in the current release that are supported in MODFLOW-2005, most of the popular capabilities in previous MODFLOW versions are available in MODFLOW 6. The current version is 6.2.2, released July 30, 2021.

Packages 
The names in this table are the labels used to turn MODFLOW capabilities on and off via a key input file. Most capabilities have many alternatives or can be omitted, but the ones related to the BASIC Package are always required. Many of the capabilities introduced are supported in later versions, though the grid change enabled with MODFLOW-USG and MODFLOW 6 meant that such backward compatibility was rather selective.

Graphical user interfaces 
There are several graphical interfaces to MODFLOW, which often include the compiled MODFLOW code with modifications. These programs aid the input of data for creating MODFLOW models.

Non-commercial interfaces 
Non-commercial MODFLOW versions are free, however, their licensing usually limit the use to non-profit educational or research purposes.
 ModelMuse is a grid-independent graphical user interface from the USGS for MODFLOW 6, MODPATH, SUTRA, and PHAST version 1.51. There are no license restrictions. The source code is included.
 FloPy is a Python package for creating, running, and post-processing MODFLOW-based models.
 MODFLOW-GUI – Made by the USGS: it is updated often to match the current USGS MODFLOW development. It supports MODFLOW-96, MODFLOW-2000, MODFLOW-2005, MODPATH, ZONEBUDGET, GWT, MT3DMS, SEAWAT, and GWM. Source code for MODFLOW-GUI is included. It depends on Argus ONE: a commercial interface for constructing generic models. There are no license restrictions beyond those of Argus ONE.
 PMWIN – "Processing MODFLOW" (for Windows) – powerful freeware for MODFLOW processing and visualization, provided alongside an instructional book; also available in Traditional Chinese. The license for this version is limited to non-commercial use.
 mflab - mflab is a MATLAB interface to MODFLOW. The user builds and analyzes models by writing a set of MATLAB scripts. This results in flexible and efficient workflows, allowing a great deal of automation.
 iMOD - Free and open source interface developed by Deltares. iMOD contains an accelerated version of MODFLOW with fast, flexible and consistent sub-domain modeling techniques. Facilitating large, high resolution MODFLOW modeling and geo-editing of the subsurface
 FREEWAT is a free and open source, QGIS-integrated modelling platform integrating MODFLOW (MODFLOW versions integrated are MODFLOW-2005 and MODFLOW-OWHM) and the following MODFLOW-related simulation codes: MT3DMS, MT3D-USGS, SEAWAT, ZONE BUDGET, MODPATH, UCODE-2014. FREEWAT has been developed in the framework of the H2020 FREEWAT project (FREE and open source software tools for WATer resource management), financed by the EU Commission under the call WATER INNOVATION: BOOSTING ITS VALUE FOR EUROPE. The source code is released under a GNU GENERAL PUBLIC LICENSE, Version 2, June 1991, along with a complete set of User Manuals and tutorials.

Commercial programs 
Commercial MODFLOW programs are typically used by governments and consultants for  practical applications of MODFLOW to real-world groundwater problems. Professional versions of MODFLOW are generally priced at a minimum of around $1000 and typically range upward to US$7000. This is a list of commercial programs for MODFLOW:
 Argus ONE
 GMS – Groundwater Modeling System
 Groundwater Vistas
 Leapfrog Hydro
 Processing Modflow
 Visual MODFLOW

All current versions of these programs run only on Microsoft Windows, however previous versions of GMS (up to Version 3.1) were compiled for several Unix platforms.

Former graphical interfaces 
 Graphic Groundwater – Windows-based interface
 ModelCad – A Windows-based interface, developed by Geraghty and Miller, Inc.
 ModIME – A DOS-based interface by S.S. Papadopulos & Associates, Inc.

See also 
 FEFLOW
 HydroGeoSphere
Hydrological optimization
 MIKE SHE
 MT3D

References

External links 
 MODFLOW and related programs official website
 Online guide to MODFLOW-2000
 MODFLOW Users Group on Google Groups

Hydrology models
Hydrogeology software
United States Geological Survey
Geology software for Linux
Public-domain software
Free science software